Ahmed Dhib (20 November 1932 in Tunis-15 November 2009) was a Tunisian football manager. He coached the Tunisia national football team. He also coached CO Transports and Club Sportif de Hammam-Lif.

References

Tunisian footballers
Tunisian football managers
CS Hammam-Lif managers
Espérance Sportive de Tunis managers
1932 births
2009 deaths
JS Kairouan managers
Association footballers not categorized by position
CO Transports players
Stade Tunisien players
Club Africain players
Al Ain FC managers